Last Call For Goose Creek is the first studio album by hard rock band Shaman's Harvest. It was released in 1999.

Track listing

References

1999 debut albums
Shaman's Harvest albums